The UEFA Women's Cup 2007–08 was the seventh edition of the UEFA Women's Cup football club tournament (since rebranded as the UEFA Women's Champions League). 45 teams from 44 football associations took part this season. The tournament ended with Frankfurt of Germany emerging out as the winners in the final after a 4–3 aggregate win over Umeå of Sweden.

First qualifying round

Group A1
Played in Siauliai and Pakruojis, Lithuania.

Group A2
Played in Toftir and Tórshavn.

Group A3
Played in Neulengbach and Sankt Pölten, Austria.

Group A4
Played in Osijek, Croatia.

Group A5
Played in Ljubljana and Domzale.

Group A6
Played in Strumica, Macedonia.

Group A7
Played in Krasnoarmeysk and Schelkov.

Group A8
Played in Thessaloniki, Greece.

Group A9
Played in Orhei and Chisinau, Moldova.

Group A10
Played in Holon, Jerusalem and Rishon Le-Zion, Israel.

Second qualifying round

Group B1
Played in Borehamwood and Saint Albans, England.

Group B2
Played in Umeå, Sweden.

Group B3
Played in Bierbeek, Belgium.

Group B4
Played in Lyon and Bron, France.

Quarter-finals
The first legs was played on 14 & 15 November 2007, and the second legs on 21 & 22 November 2007.

First Leg

Second Leg

Semi-finals
The first legs are scheduled to be played on March 29, and the second leg ons April 6, 2008.

First Leg

Second Leg

Final

The first leg was played on May 17, 2008, and the second leg on May 24, 2008.

Top goalscorers 
(excluding qualifying rounds)

References

External links
 2007–08 season at UEFA website

Women's Cup
2007-08
UEFA
UEFA